"Aye" (pronounced ah yay) is a song by Nigerian singer Davido. It was produced by TSpize, a record producer affiliated with Runtown. The song peaked at number 5 on MTV Base's Official Naija Top 10 chart from March 28 through April 3, 2014, and was primarily released to celebrate Valentine's Day.

Composition
It was alleged that Davido bought "Aye" from Runtown, an artist who featured him on "Gallardo".

Critical reception
"Aye" received positive reviews from music critics. Micheal Abimboye of Premium Times newspaper said the song's instrusmental is "reminiscent of that made popular by kegite clubs" and that its "cool tempo makes it enjoyable and reminds one of an old school video of a generation past slow-grooving to high-life in a jazz club." A writer for Fuse.com.ng described the melody of "Aye" as "charismatic" and said it "provides a sing along vibe that catches the lips of both old and young as they hold on to their head gear or do the Bata dance while singing happily". David Drake of Pitchfork opined that "Aye" is "perhaps the sweetest song of devotion yet written". Drake also said its "thicket of rhythms eventually taking shape as clean, piercing guitar lines cut through to provide a melodic counterpoint."

Music video
The music video for "Aye" was shot and directed in Nigeria by Clarence Peters. It was uploaded to YouTube on February 7, 2014, at a total length of 4 minutes and 11 seconds. In the video, Davido plays a poor farmer who is physically attracted to a princess. Davido took the unconventional route by shooting the video in a rural setting. The locality of the area where the video was shot complements the song's lyrics. According to YouTube's first quarter report, the music video was the most watched video by Nigerians on the video sharing site.

Accolades
"Aye" won Hottest Single of the Year at the 2014 Nigeria Entertainment Awards. It was nominated for Most Popular Song of the Year at the 2014 City People Entertainment Awards. The music video for "Aye" was nominated for Most Gifted Male, Most Gifted Afro Pop, Most Gifted West and Most Gifted Video of the Year at the 2014 Channel O Music Video Awards. Moreover, "Aye" was nominated for Best Pop Single and won Song of the Year at The Headies 2014.

Year-end lists

Release history

References

External links

2014 songs
2014 singles
Davido songs
Song recordings produced by TSpize
Songs written by Davido